St Martin's College is located at Triq Is- Swatar, L-Imsida, Malta.

History 
St Martin's College forms part of a co-educational establishment in Malta catering for pupils aged 2 years and 1 month to 18 years. Founded in 1905, by Ethel Yabsley and Madeleine Sceberras, the school originally catered for the children of British families stationed in Malta. In time, the school established itself at Windsor Terrace, Sliema. In 1991, the school moved to its present premises in Swatar. Further expansion took place in 1993. St Martin's College Sixth Form was founded in 2007.

See also

 Education in Malta
 List of schools in Malta

References

External links
 , the official website of Chiswick House School and St Martin's College

Msida
Sixth form colleges in Malta